The Armenian Genocide: A Complete History is a 2006 book by Raymond Kévorkian that aims to give a comprehensive account of the Armenian genocide. The book was originally published in French as Le Génocide des Arméniens. it was published in English in 2011, by I.B. Tauris.

References

2006 non-fiction books
I.B. Tauris books
History books about the Armenian genocide